Baseball was played at the 2007 Southeast Asian Games. The Philippines national baseball team were the defending gold medalists.

The games were held at the Queen Sirikit Sports Center, Pathum Thani Province; the tournament format was a single round-robin, the team with the best record winning the gold medal.

Medalists

Standings

Results

Schedule
Host Thailand had the most favorable schedule, with two back-to-back games separated by two days, plus their last game against the Philippines was after another rest day.

The Philippines' last three games were played in the last 3 games; Cambodia and Indonesia had to play 4 games in as many days, while Malaysia, Myanmar and the Philippines had to play 3 games in 3 days.

December 7

December 8

December 9

December 10

December 11

December 12

December 13

December 14

References
Baseball at the official website of the 2007 SEA Games

Southeast Asian Games 2007
2007 Southeast Asian Games events
2007
International baseball competitions hosted by Thailand